JGW may refer to:

 Joy of Giving Week
 J.G. Wentworth
 Jr. Gone Wild
 John Greenleaf Whittier